Kruise Leeming (born 7 September 1995) is an England Knights international rugby league footballer who plays as a  for the Leeds Rhinos in the Betfred Super League.

He played the Huddersfield Giants in the Super League and on loan from Huddersfield in 2016 at Oldham (Heritage № 1359) in the Kingstone Press Championship.

Background
Leeming was born in Lobamba, Eswatini (then Swaziland), but raised in Halifax, West Yorkshire, England.

Kruise is a graduate of the Giants' academy system. and was called up to the England Knights squad in 2019 along with 3 other Giants players.

Club career

Huddersfield Giants
A product of Huddersfield's academy, Leeming made his Super League début against Warrington Wolves in 2013, and scored with his first touch of the ball. He went on to make one further appearances that year, and four appearances in 2014. Leeming established himself in the Huddersfield first-team in 2015, playing 15 times including an appearance from the bench in each of Huddersfield's Super 8s fixtures.

He has become a regular first team player since 2015 and was an integral part of the first team squad.

Leeds Rhinos
It was announced in early 2020 that Leeming would join the Leeds Rhinos.

On 17 October 2020, he played in the 2020 Challenge Cup Final victory for Leeds over Salford at Wembley Stadium.

In round 8 of the 2021 Super League season, Leeming scored two tries for Leeds in a 60-16 victory over Castleford.
In the 2021 Magic Weekend, Leeming scored a try and kicked a drop goal in Leeds 25-24 victory over Hull FC.
Leeming played a total of 23 games for Leeds in the 2021 Super League season including the club's 36-8 loss against St Helens in the semi-final.
In round 17 of the 2022 Betfred Super League season, Leeming scored two tries for Leeds in a 62-16 victory over Hull F.C.
On 24 September 2022, Leeming played for Leeds in their 24-12 loss to St Helens RFC in the 2022 Super League Grand Final. Leeming scored a try in the first half of the match.

International career
In July 2018 he was selected in the England Knights Performance squad. Later that year he was selected for the England Knights on their tour of Papua New Guinea. He played against Papua New Guinea at the Lae Football Stadium.

Kruise was called up to the England Knights squad in 2019. In 2019 he was selected for the England Knights against Jamaica at Headingley Rugby Stadium.

On 25 June 2021 he played for the Combined Nations All Stars in their 26-24 victory over England, staged at the Halliwell Jones Stadium, Warrington, as part of England’s 2021 Rugby League World Cup preparation.

References

External links
Leeds Rhinos profile
Huddersfield Giants profile
SL profile

1995 births
Living people
Combined Nationalities rugby league team players
England Knights national rugby league team players
Huddersfield Giants players
Leeds Rhinos captains
Leeds Rhinos players
Oldham R.L.F.C. players
People from Lobamba
Rugby league hookers
Swazi sportsmen